"Here be dragons" means dangerous or unexplored territories, in imitation of a medieval practice of putting illustrations of dragons, sea monsters and other mythological creatures on uncharted areas of maps where potential dangers were thought to exist.

History 

Until the Ostrich Egg Globe was offered for sale in 2012 at the London Map Fair held at the Royal Geographical Society, the only known historical use of this phrase in the Latin form "HC SVNT DRACONES" (i.e., 'here are dragons') was the Hunt-Lenox Globe dating from 1504. Earlier maps contain a variety of references to mythical and real creatures, but the Ostrich Egg Globe and its twin the Lenox Globe are the only known surviving globes to bear this phrase. The term appears on both globes at the peripheral, extreme end of the Asian continent.

The classical phrase used by medieval cartographers was HIC SVNT LEONES (literally, "here are lions") when denoting unknown territories on maps.

Dragons on maps 

Dragons appear on a few other historical maps:

 The T-O Psalter world map ( AD) has dragons, as symbols of sin, in a lower "frame" below the world, balancing Jesus and angels on the top, but the dragons do not appear on the map proper.
 The Borgia map (c. 1430), in the Vatican Library, states, over a dragon-like figure in Asia (in the upper left quadrant of the map), "". ("Here there are even men who have large four-foot horns, and there are even serpents so large that they could eat an ox whole.")
 The Fra Mauro Map (c. 1450) shows the "Island of Dragons", an imaginary island in the Atlantic Ocean. In an inscription near Herat in modern-day Afghanistan, Fra Mauro says that in the mountains nearby "there are a number of dragons, in whose forehead is a stone that  cures many infirmities", and describes the locals' way of hunting those dragons to get the stones. This is thought to be based on Albertus Magnus's treatise De mineralibus. In an inscription elsewhere on the map, the cartographer expresses his scepticism regarding "serpents, dragons and basilisks" mentioned by "some historiographers".
 A 19th-century Japanese map, the Jishin-no-ben, in the shape of ouroboros, depicts a dragon associated with causing earthquakes.

Other creatures on maps 
 Ptolemy's atlas in Geographia (originally 2nd century, taken up again in the 15th century) warns of elephants, hippos and cannibals.
 The Tabula Peutingeriana (a medieval copy of Roman map) has "", "" and "" ("in these places elephants are born, in these places scorpions are born, here Cynocephali are born").
 Cotton MS. Tiberius B.V. fol. 56v (10th century), British Library Manuscript Collection, has "hic abundant leones" ("here lions abound"), along with a picture of a lion, near the east coast of Asia (at the top of the map towards the left); this map also has a text-only serpent reference in southernmost Africa (bottom left of the map): "Zugis regio ipsa est et Affrica. est enim fertilis. sed ulterior bestiis et serpentibus plena" ("This region of Zugis is in Africa; it is rather fertile, but on the other hand it is full of beasts and serpents.")
 The Ebstorf map (13th century) has a dragon in the extreme south-eastern part of Africa, together with an asp and a basilisk.
 Giovanni Leardo's map (1442) has, in southernmost Africa, "Dixerto dexabitado p. chaldo e p. serpent".
 Martin Waldseemüller's Carta marina navigatoria (1516) has "an elephant-like creature in northernmost Norway, accompanied by a legend explaining that this 'morsus' with two long and quadrangular teeth congregated there", i.e. a walrus, which would have seemed monstrous at the time.
 Waldseemüller's Carta marina navigatoria (1522), revised by Laurentius Fries, has the morsus moved to the Davis Strait.
 Bishop Olaus Magnus's Carta Marina map of Scandinavia (1539) has many monsters in the northern sea, as well as a winged, bipedal, predatory land animal resembling a dragon in northern Lapland.
 On European maps of Africa, up until the Berlin Conference and the subsequent Scramble for Africa produced accurate cartographic representations of Africa, elephants replaced dragons as placeholders for unknown regions. An excerpt from On Poetry: a Rhapsody by the Irish satirist Jonathan Swift states: "So geographers, in Afric maps, With savage pictures fill their gaps, And o'er uninhabitable downs, Place elephants for want of towns".

See also

References 
Notes

Bibliography

External links
 Myths & Legends On Old Maps (Chapter 10)
 "Here be Dragons" by David Montgomery, Washington Post, 3/14/07
 "Here Be Dragons: An Introduction to Critical Thinking" by Brian Dunning from Skeptoid
 "Here Be Dragons" by Brian Dunning – Spanish Subtitled Version (Versión Subtitulada al Español de "Aquí Hay Dragones" por Brian Dunning)
"No Old Maps Actually Say 'Here Be Dragons' -but an ancient globe does"

Cartography
English phrases
Dragons
Folklore